The Maria Moors Cabot Prizes are the oldest international awards in the field of journalism. They are presented each fall by the Trustees of Columbia University to journalists in the Western hemisphere who are viewed as having made a significant contributions to upholding freedom of the press in the Americas and Inter-American understanding. Since 2003, the prize can be awarded to an organization instead of an individual.

Award
The American Boston industrialist and philanthropist, Godfrey Lowell Cabot, who founded the Cabot Corporation and was also a major benefactor of both MIT and Harvard, where the general science library is named in his honor, established the Maria Moors Cabot Prizes in 1938, in memory of his wife.

The prizes have been awarded annually since 1939, by the Trustees of Columbia University in the City of New York, on recommendation of the dean of the Graduate School of Journalism and the Cabot Prize Board, which is composed of journalists and educators.

The awards board consists of the following persons:

Tracy Wilkinson, from the Los Angeles Times where she covered the Iraq War, among others.

Carlos Dada, Salvadoran journalist, founder and director of El Faro. He won the Maria Moors Cabot Prize in 2011.

John Dinges, The Godfrey Lowell Cabot Professor of Journalism at Columbia University is an author and journalist specializing in Latin America. He received a Maria Moors Cabot Prizes medal in 1992.

Juan Enriquez Cabot, Authority on economic and political impacts of life sciences. Best-selling author; speaker; investor/co-founder in multiple start up companies; board member for both private and public companies/non-profits. Former founding Director of Life Sciences Project at Harvard Business School.

June Carolyn Erlick, editor-in-chief of ReVista, the Harvard Review of Latin America.

Gustavo Gorritti, Peruvian journalist, the founder of lDL Reporteros.  He is a recipient of a Nieman Fellowship at Harvard University and a winner of the Maria Moors Cabot Prize in 1992 and the FNPI Gabriel García Marquez award. Expert in Peruvian internal war and anti corruption investigation. 
 
Carlos Lauría, Americas Program Coordinator at the Committee to Protect Journalists.
 
Julia Preston, national correspondent for The New York Times. Preston received a Maria Moors Cabot Prize in 1997.
 
María Teresa Ronderos, Serves as Director of VerdadAbierta.com. Ronderos is an editorial advisor to Semana.  She received the King of Spain Ibero-American Award in 1997 and received a Maria Moors Cabot Prize in 2007.
 
Paulo Sotero, director of the Brazil Institute of the Woodrow Wilson Center in Washington, D.C.

Recipients
Three to four medalists from the United States, Latin America, and Canada are selected each year. Prize winners receive the Cabot medal and a $5,000 honorarium, plus travel expenses to New York City and hotel accommodations for the presentation ceremony.

As of 2014, 273 Cabot gold medals and 56 special citations have been awarded to journalists from more than 30 countries in the Americas.

Ceremony
The winners of the award are announced between May and July, and the prizes are presented by the President of Columbia University each fall, at a ceremony in the rotunda of Low Memorial Library.

Yoani Sánchez case
In 2009, 34-year-old Cuban writer Yoani Sánchez became the first blogger to win the Maria Moors Cabot Prize. The award was given for her blog, Generación Y, which contained much criticism of the Cuban regime. Sánchez was denied an exit visa to travel to New York to receive her prize.

References

External links 

 
American journalism awards
Awards established in 1938
Awards and prizes of Columbia University
Columbia University Graduate School of Journalism